Walkerana phrynoderma is a species of frog endemic to the Anaimalai Hills, of the Western Ghats of Kerala and Tamil nadu states in southern India. This species is known from Munnar, Eravikulam National Park, Valparai tea gardens, Anamalai Tiger Reserve, Grass Hills National Park and Palni hills. It is a very rare terrestrial frog species associated with leaf-litter in tropical moist forest. It is threatened by habitat loss caused by subsistence wood collecting. It has the status of one of the "Top 100 Evolutionarily Distinct and Globally Endangered Amphibians".

References

phrynoderma
Endemic fauna of the Western Ghats
Frogs of India
Amphibians described in 1882
Taxobox binomials not recognized by IUCN